Juan Benítez Ramos (born 10 March 1990), commonly known as Juanito, is a Spanish footballer who plays for Xerez CD as a midfielder.

Club career
Born in Jerez de la Frontera, Province of Cádiz, Juanito finished his formation with Xerez CD, making his debuts as a senior with the reserves in 2010, in the regional divisions. He played his first official game with the Andalusians' first team on 3 June 2012, featuring 62 minutes as a substitute in a 0–6 home loss against FC Barcelona B in the Segunda División.

On 6 August 2013, Juanito signed with CF Pobla de Mafumet in Tercera División. He subsequently resumed his career in the lower leagues, representing UB Lebrijana, CD Guadalcacín, Jerez Industrial CF (two stints), PE Sant Jordi and UD Roteña before returning to Xerez in 2016.

References

External links
 
 
 
 

1990 births
Living people
Footballers from Jerez de la Frontera
Spanish footballers
Association football midfielders
Segunda División players
Tercera División players
Xerez CD B players
Xerez CD footballers
CF Pobla de Mafumet footballers
Jerez Industrial CF players